The 2014 ITU Triathlon World Cup is a series of triathlon races organised by the International Triathlon Union (ITU) for elite-level triathletes held during the 2014 season. For 2014, ten races were announced as part of the World Cup series. Each race is held over a distance of 1500 m swim, 40 km cycle, 10 km run (an Olympic-distance triathlon).

Triathlon World Cup schedule

Event results

Mooloolaba

New Plymouth

Chengdu

Huatulco

Jiayuguan

See also
2014 ITU World Triathlon Series
2015 ITU Triathlon World Cup

References

External links

2014
World Cup